Pablo Rodrigo Melo (born July 4, 1982 in Rivera) is a Uruguayan footballer who plays as a defender for Club Atlético Cerro.

Teams
  Cerro 2000–2004
  Danubio 2005
  Tiro Federal 2006–2007
  Cerro 2007
  Nacional 2008
  Alianza Lima 2009
  Cerro 2010
  Deportes La Serena 2010
  Manta 2011
  América de Cali 2011
  Liverpool 2012–2013
  Aragua 2013
  Cerro 2013–present

References
 Profile at BDFA 
 Pablo Melo Profile at Tenfield Digital 

1982 births
Living people
People from Rivera Department
Uruguayan footballers
Uruguayan expatriate footballers
Uruguay international footballers
Uruguayan Primera División players
Categoría Primera A players
Peruvian Primera División players
Club Nacional de Football players
C.A. Cerro players
Danubio F.C. players
Club Alianza Lima footballers
Tiro Federal footballers
Deportes La Serena footballers
América de Cali footballers
Expatriate footballers in Chile
Expatriate footballers in Argentina
Expatriate footballers in Colombia
Expatriate footballers in Ecuador
Expatriate footballers in Peru
Expatriate footballers in Venezuela

Association football defenders